The 1994 Philadelphia Phillies season was the 112th season in the history of the franchise.

Offseason
November 2, 1993: Heathcliff Slocumb was traded by the Cleveland Indians to the Philadelphia Phillies for Ruben Amaro.
 December 2, 1993: Mitch Williams was traded by the Philadelphia Phillies to the Houston Astros for Doug Jones and Jeff Juden.
 February 9, 1994: Terry Mulholland was traded by the Philadelphia Phillies with a player to be named later to the New York Yankees for Bobby Muñoz, Ryan Karp, and Kevin Jordan. The Philadelphia Phillies sent Jeff Patterson (November 8, 1994) to the New York Yankees to complete the trade.

Regular season
By Friday, August 12, 1994, the Phillies had compiled a 54–61 record through 115 games. They had scored 521 runs (4.53 per game) and allowed 497 runs (4.32 per game). They finished the strike-shortened season 28th in home runs, with just 80 (tied with the Pittsburgh Pirates).

Season standings

Record vs. opponents

Notable transactions
April 29, 1994: Roger Mason was purchased by the New York Mets from the Philadelphia Phillies.

1994 game Log

|- style="background:#bfb"
| 1 || April 4 || @ Rockies || 12–6 || Heathcliff Slocumb (1–0) || Mike Munoz (0–1) || None || 72,470 || 1–0
|- style="background:#bfb"
| 2 || April 6 || @ Rockies || 7–5 || Roger Mason (1–0) || Darren Holmes (0–1) || Doug Jones (1) || 50,875 || 2–0
|- style="background:#bfb"
| 3 || April 7 || @ Rockies || 13–8 || Heathcliff Slocumb (2–0) || Steve Reed (0–1) || Bobby Muñoz (1) || 48,021 || 3–0
|- style="background:#fbb"
| 4 || April 8 || @ Reds || 4–5 (10) || Héctor Carrasco (2–0) || David West (0–1) || None || 27,868 || 3–1
|- style="background:#fbb"
| 5 || April 9 || @ Reds || 1–2 || John Smiley (1–0) || Curt Schilling (0–1) || Héctor Carrasco (1) || 25,666 || 3–2
|- style="background:#fbb"
| 6 || April 10 || @ Reds || 5–7 || Pete Schourek (1–0) || Jeff Juden (0–1) || Chuck McElroy (1) || 21,131 || 3–3
|- style="background:#fbb"
| 7 || April 11 || Rockies || 7–8 || Bruce Ruffin (1–0) || Roger Mason (1–1) || Darren Holmes (1) || 58,627 || 3–4
|- style="background:#bfb"
| 8 || April 13 || Rockies || 12–3 || Ben Rivera (1–0) || Greg W. Harris (0–1) || None || 23,346 || 4–4
|- style="background:#fbb"
| 9 || April 14 || Rockies || 0–5 || David Nied (2–0) || Curt Schilling (0–2) || None || 24,856 || 4–5
|- style="background:#bfb"
| 10 || April 15 || Reds || 3–1 || Jeff Juden (1–1) || John Smiley (1–1) || Doug Jones (2) || 32,980 || 5–5
|- style="background:#bfb"
| 11 || April 16 || Reds || 6–4 || Danny Jackson (1–0) || Erik Hanson (0–1) || Doug Jones (3) || 36,070 || 6–5
|- style="background:#fbb"
| 12 || April 17 || Reds || 0–7 || Tom Browning (1–0) || Shawn Boskie (0–1) || None || 43,400 || 6–6
|- style="background:#bfb"
| 13 || April 18 || Dodgers || 5–4 || Doug Jones (1–0) || Gary Wayne (0–2) || None || 26,666 || 7–6
|- style="background:#fbb"
| 14 || April 19 || Dodgers || 7–8 || Todd Worrell (1–1) || Doug Jones (1–1) || Darren Dreifort (1) || 35,170 || 7–7
|- style="background:#fbb"
| 15 || April 20 || @ Giants || 4–5 || Bill Swift (3–1) || Jeff Juden (1–2) || Mike Jackson (3) || 18,182 || 7–8
|- style="background:#bfb"
| 16 || April 21 || @ Giants || 6–1 || Danny Jackson (2–0) || Salomón Torres (0–2) || None || 18,918 || 8–8
|- style="background:#fbb"
| 17 || April 22 || @ Padres || 5–6 || Trevor Hoffman (1–0) || David West (0–2) || None || 19,069 || 8–9
|- style="background:#fbb"
| 18 || April 23 || @ Padres || 2–8 || Tim Mauser (1–0) || Ben Rivera (1–1) || Pedro Martínez (1) || 32,745 || 8–10
|- style="background:#fbb"
| 19 || April 24 || @ Padres || 5–6 || Andy Benes (1–4) || Curt Schilling (0–3) || Trevor Hoffman (3) || 11,403 || 8–11
|- style="background:#fbb"
| 20 || April 26 || @ Dodgers || 3–4 || Gary Wayne (1–2) || David West (0–3) || Todd Worrell (2) || 28,194 || 8–12
|- style="background:#fbb"
| 21 || April 27 || @ Dodgers || 4–5 (10) || Jim Gott (2–1) || Larry Andersen (0–1) || None || 30,065 || 8–13
|- style="background:#bfb"
| 22 || April 29 || Giants || 6–3 || Ben Rivera (2–1) || Bryan Hickerson (1–1) || None || 30,977 || 9–13
|- style="background:#fbb"
| 23 || April 30 || Giants || 0–1 || John Burkett (3–1) || Curt Schilling (0–4) || Rod Beck (2) || 37,019 || 9–14
|-

|- style="background:#bfb"
| 24 || May 1 || Giants || 6–4 || Heathcliff Slocumb (3–0) || Bill Swift (3–3) || Doug Jones (4) || 50,588 || 10–14
|- style="background:#bfb"
| 25 || May 2 || Padres || 7–2 || Danny Jackson (3–0) || Andy Ashby (0–3) || None || 26,481 || 11–14
|- style="background:#fbb"
| 26 || May 3 || Padres || 3–8 || A. J. Sager (1–2) || Jeff Juden (1–3) || None || 24,489 || 11–15
|- style="background:#bbb"
| – || May 4 || Padres || colspan=6 | Postponed (rain); Makeup: July 22 as a traditional double-header
|- style="background:#fbb"
| 27 || May 5 || @ Marlins || 0–5 || Chris Hammond (2–3) || Ben Rivera (2–2) || None || 26,329 || 11–16
|- style="background:#fbb"
| 28 || May 6 || @ Marlins || 5–9 || David Weathers (5–1) || Curt Schilling (0–5) || None || 31,368 || 11–17
|- style="background:#fbb"
| 29 || May 7 || @ Marlins || 7–8 (11) || Richie Lewis (1–1) || David West (0–4) || None || 41,002 || 11–18
|- style="background:#bfb"
| 30 || May 8 || @ Marlins || 9–2 || Danny Jackson (4–0) || Charlie Hough (3–1) || None || 38,584 || 12–18
|- style="background:#fbb"
| 31 || May 9 || @ Braves || 2–7 || Steve Avery (3–1) || Jeff Juden (1–4) || None || 44,987 || 12–19
|- style="background:#fbb"
| 32 || May 10 || @ Braves || 8–9 (15) || Mike Stanton (1–0) || Andy Carter (0–1) || None || 47,014 || 12–20
|- style="background:#fbb"
| 33 || May 11 || @ Braves || 2–4 || Greg Maddux (6–2) || Curt Schilling (0–6) || Greg McMichael (7) || 46,985 || 12–21
|- style="background:#bfb"
| 34 || May 12 || Pirates || 6–4 || Tommy Greene (1–0) || Zane Smith (4–3) || Doug Jones (5) || 32,481 || 13–21
|- style="background:#bfb"
| 35 || May 13 || Pirates || 12–1 || Danny Jackson (5–0) || Paul Wagner (3–3) || None || 32,281 || 14–21
|- style="background:#bfb"
| 36 || May 14 || Pirates || 3–2 || Mike Williams (1–0) || Steve Cooke (1–4) || Doug Jones (6) || 39,916 || 15–21
|- style="background:#bfb"
| 37 || May 15 || Pirates || 1–0 || Shawn Boskie (1–1) || Jon Lieber (0–1) || Doug Jones (7) || 53,396 || 16–21
|- style="background:#fbb"
| 38 || May 16 || Expos || 1–4 || Butch Henry (1–0) || Curt Schilling (0–7) || Mel Rojas (10) || 28,236 || 16–22
|- style="background:#bfb"
| 39 || May 17 || Expos || 6–5 || Doug Jones (2–1) || John Wetteland (2–3) || None || 36,233 || 17–22
|- style="background:#fbb"
| 40 || May 18 || Expos || 1–6 || Jeff Fassero (4–2) || Danny Jackson (5–1) || None || 41,032 || 17–23
|- style="background:#bfb"
| 41 || May 20 || Mets || 5–3 || Mike Williams (2–0) || Mauro Gozzo (2–1) || Doug Jones (8) || 34,924 || 18–23
|- style="background:#bfb"
| 42 || May 21 || Mets || 9–8 || Bob Wells (1–0) || Doug Linton (4–1) || Doug Jones (9) || 43,443 || 19–23
|- style="background:#bfb"
| 43 || May 22 || Mets || 8–3 || Tommy Greene (2–0) || Pete Smith (2–5) || None || 53,340 || 20–23
|- style="background:#bfb"
| 44 || May 23 || @ Cardinals || 11–3 || Danny Jackson (6–1) || Tom Urbani (1–4) || None || 30,648 || 21–23
|- style="background:#bfb"
| 45 || May 24 || @ Cardinals || 4–0 || Heathcliff Slocumb (4–0) || Mike Pérez (1–1) || None || 25,618 || 22–23
|- style="background:#fbb"
| 46 || May 25 || @ Cardinals || 5–10 || Bryan Eversgerd (2–0) || Mike Williams (2–1) || None || 24,123 || 22–24
|- style="background:#fbb"
| 47 || May 27 || Astros || 2–4 || Shane Reynolds (3–1) || Shawn Boskie (1–2) || John Hudek (5) || 41,013 || 22–25
|- style="background:#fbb"
| 48 || May 28 || Astros || 5–7 || Brian Williams (1–2) || Andy Carter (0–2) || Todd Jones (1) || 40,523 || 22–26
|- style="background:#bfb"
| 49 || May 29 || Astros || 4–2 || David West (1–4) || Doug Drabek (7–2) || Doug Jones (10) || 52,390 || 23–26
|- style="background:#fbb"
| 50 || May 30 || @ Cubs || 0–3 || Willie Banks (6–4) || Bobby Muñoz (0–1) || Randy Myers (12) || 35,834 || 23–27
|- style="background:#bfb"
| 51 || May 31 || @ Cubs || 8–7 || Larry Andersen (1–1) || Randy Myers (0–2) || Doug Jones (11) || 30,110 || 24–27
|-

|- style="background:#bfb"
| 52 || June 1 || @ Cubs || 4–2 || Shawn Boskie (2–2) || Mike Morgan (0–7) || Doug Jones (12) || 27,402 || 25–27
|- style="background:#bfb"
| 53 || June 2 || @ Cubs || 4–2 || Danny Jackson (7–1) || Anthony Young (3–4) || Doug Jones (13) || 31,595 || 26–27
|- style="background:#fbb"
| 54 || June 3 || @ Astros || 2–4 || Brian Williams (2–2) || David West (1–5) || John Hudek (7) || 31,280 || 26–28
|- style="background:#fbb"
| 55 || June 4 || @ Astros || 1–5 || Doug Drabek (8–2) || Bobby Muñoz (0–2) || None || 23,455 || 26–29
|- style="background:#fbb"
| 56 || June 5 || @ Astros || 2–4 || Darryl Kile (4–2) || Mike Williams (2–2) || John Hudek (8) || 20,694 || 26–30
|- style="background:#bfb"
| 57 || June 6 || Cubs || 3–1 || Shawn Boskie (3–2) || Jim Bullinger (3–1) || Doug Jones (14) || 25,838 || 27–30
|- style="background:#bfb"
| 58 || June 7 || Cubs || 7–6 || Paul Quantrill (2–1) || Randy Myers (0–3) || Doug Jones (15) || 36,543 || 28–30
|- style="background:#bfb"
| 59 || June 8 || Cubs || 3–0 || David West (2–5) || Kevin Foster (0–1) || Doug Jones (16) || 35,431 || 29–30
|- style="background:#bfb"
| 60 || June 9 || Cardinals || 6–2 || Bobby Muñoz (1–2) || Vicente Palacios (1–3) || Paul Quantrill (1) || 34,759 || 30–30
|- style="background:#fbb"
| 61 || June 10 || Cardinals || 3–4 || Rick Sutcliffe (3–2) || Mike Williams (2–3) || Mike Pérez (12) || 36,652 || 30–31
|- style="background:#fbb"
| 62 || June 11 || Cardinals || 4–7 || Omar Olivares (1–0) || Shawn Boskie (3–3) || René Arocha (4) || 39,065 || 30–32
|- style="background:#bfb"
| 63 || June 12 || Cardinals || 7–2 || Danny Jackson (8–1) || Bob Tewksbury (8–5) || None || 48,682 || 31–32
|- style="background:#fbb"
| 64 || June 13 || @ Mets || 3–4 || Bret Saberhagen (7–3) || David West (2–6) || John Franco (15) || 17,555 || 31–33
|- style="background:#bfb"
| 65 || June 14 || @ Mets || 3–2 || Bobby Muñoz (2–2) || Dwight Gooden (2–3) || Doug Jones (17) || 17,914 || 32–33
|- style="background:#fbb"
| 66 || June 15 || @ Mets || 0–1 || Bobby J. Jones (7–5) || Mike Williams (2–4) || John Franco (16) || 18,397 || 32–34
|- style="background:#bfb"
| 67 || June 17 || @ Expos || 10–8 || Paul Quantrill (3–1) || John Wetteland (2–4) || Doug Jones (18) || 30,235 || 33–34
|- style="background:#bfb"
| 68 || June 18 || @ Expos || 8–4 || Danny Jackson (9–1) || Gabe White (1–1) || None || 28,354 || 34–34
|- style="background:#bfb"
| 69 || June 19 || @ Expos || 13–0 || Bobby Muñoz (3–2) || Jeff Fassero (5–5) || None || 15,092 || 35–34
|- style="background:#fbb"
| 70 || June 21 || @ Pirates || 1–7 || Steve Cooke (3–5) || Shawn Boskie (3–4) || None || 19,568 || 35–35
|- style="background:#fbb"
| 71 || June 22 || @ Pirates || 4–5 || Ravelo Manzanillo (2–1) || Heathcliff Slocumb (4–1) || Alejandro Peña (5) || 26,376 || 35–36
|- style="background:#fbb"
| 72 || June 24 || Braves || 4–9 || Tom Glavine (8–7) || Danny Jackson (9–2) || Mike Stanton (2) || 47,523 || 35–37
|- style="background:#bfb"
| 73 || June 25 || Braves || 7–1 || Bobby Muñoz (4–2) || Kent Mercker (6–2) || None || 57,961 || 36–37
|- style="background:#bfb"
| 74 || June 26 || Braves || 9–8 || Toby Borland (1–0) || Steve Avery (5–2) || Doug Jones (19) || 52,545 || 37–37
|- style="background:#bfb"
| 75 || June 27 || Marlins || 5–1 || Shawn Boskie (4–4) || Kurt Miller (1–3) || None || 34,638 || 38–37
|- style="background:#fbb"
| 76 || June 28 || Marlins || 1–2 || Jeff Mutis (1–0) || Paul Quantrill (3–2) || Robb Nen (7) || 47,027 || 38–38
|- style="background:#bfb"
| 77 || June 29 || Marlins || 5–2 || Danny Jackson (10–2) || Pat Rapp (4–4) || Doug Jones (20) || 43,337 || 39–38
|- style="background:#fbb"
| 78 || June 30 || @ Dodgers || 3–4 || Rudy Seánez (1–1) || Doug Jones (2–2) || None || 31,295 || 39–39
|-

|- style="background:#bfb"
| 79 || July 1 || @ Dodgers || 3–0 || David West (3–6) || Kevin Gross (7–5) || Doug Jones (21) || 34,978 || 40–39
|- style="background:#fbb"
| 80 || July 2 || @ Dodgers || 3–9 || Tom Candiotti (6–3) || Paul Quantrill (3–3) || None || 38,237 || 40–40
|- style="background:#fbb"
| 81 || July 3 || @ Dodgers || 1–3 || Orel Hershiser (5–4) || Fernando Valenzuela (0–1) || Todd Worrell (7) || 54,167 || 40–41
|- style="background:#bfb"
| 82 || July 4 || @ Padres || 10–4 || Danny Jackson (11–2) || Scott Sanders (3–5) || None || 23,676 || 41–41
|- style="background:#fbb"
| 83 || July 5 || @ Padres || 2–7 || Joey Hamilton (5–3) || Bobby Muñoz (4–3) || None || 7,812 || 41–42
|- style="background:#fbb"
| 84 || July 6 || @ Padres || 2–5 || Bill Krueger (1–3) || David West (3–7) || Trevor Hoffman (14) || 12,113 || 41–43
|- style="background:#fbb"
| 85 || July 7 || @ Giants || 4–5 || Bud Black (2–0) || Shawn Boskie (4–5) || Rod Beck (16) || 22,481 || 41–44
|- style="background:#fbb"
| 86 || July 8 || @ Giants || 2–3 || Mark Portugal (7–6) || Fernando Valenzuela (0–2) || Rod Beck (17) || 24,437 || 41–45
|- style="background:#fbb"
| 87 || July 9 || @ Giants || 2–3 || William Van Landingham (4–1) || Danny Jackson (11–3) || Rod Beck (18) || 35,823 || 41–46
|- style="background:#fbb"
| 88 || July 10 || @ Giants || 1–2 (10) || Dave Burba (1–5) || Doug Jones (2–3) || None || 48,263 || 41–47
|- style="background:#bbcaff;"
| – || July 12 ||colspan="7" |1994 Major League Baseball All-Star Game at Three Rivers Stadium in Pittsburgh
|- style="background:#bbb"
| – || July 14 || Dodgers || colspan=6 | Postponed (rain); Makeup: July 15 as a traditional double-header
|- style="background:#bfb"
| 89 || July 15 (1) || Dodgers || 4–3 || David West (4–7) || Kevin Gross (7–6) || Doug Jones (22) || see 2nd game || 42–47
|- style="background:#fbb"
| 90 || July 15 (2) || Dodgers || 2–3 || Tom Candiotti (7–4) || Danny Jackson (11–4) || Todd Worrell (8) || 58,247 || 42–48
|- style="background:#bfb"
| 91 || July 16 || Dodgers || 10–6 || Bobby Muñoz (5–3) || Ramón Martínez (8–6) || Toby Borland (1) || 46,679 || 43–48
|- style="background:#bfb"
| 92 || July 17 || Dodgers || 9–7 || Fernando Valenzuela (1–2) || Pedro Astacio (6–7) || Doug Jones (23) || 50,993 || 44–48
|- style="background:#fbb"
| 93 || July 18 || Giants || 5–7 || Bryan Hickerson (3–8) || Shawn Boskie (4–6) || Rod Beck (21) || 39,066 || 44–49
|- style="background:#bfb"
| 94 || July 19 || Giants || 5–2 || Danny Jackson (12–4) || Bud Black (3–1) || Doug Jones (24) || 38,559 || 45–49
|- style="background:#fbb"
| 95 || July 20 || Giants || 2–9 || Mark Portugal (9–6) || David West (4–8) || None || 43,966 || 45–50
|- style="background:#bfb"
| 96 || July 22 (1) || Padres || 4–3 || Bobby Muñoz (6–3) || Joey Hamilton (6–5) || Doug Jones (25) || see 2nd game || 46–50
|- style="background:#fbb"
| 97 || July 22 (2) || Padres || 4–7 || Pedro Martínez (3–1) || Larry Andersen (1–2) || Trevor Hoffman (15) || 38,423 || 46–51
|- style="background:#fbb"
| 98 || July 23 || Padres || 1–7 || Bill Krueger (2–4) || Ben Rivera (2–3) || None || 35,269 || 46–52
|- style="background:#bfb"
| 99 || July 24 || Padres || 5–3 || Danny Jackson (13–4) || Andy Ashby (4–10) || Doug Jones (26) || 41,971 || 47–52
|- style="background:#bfb"
| 100 || July 25 || @ Marlins || 8–1 || Curt Schilling (1–7) || David Weathers (8–9) || None || 30,082 || 48–52
|- style="background:#bfb"
| 101 || July 26 || @ Marlins || 10–8 (12) || Ben Rivera (3–3) || Robb Nen (4–5) || None || 32,648 || 49–52
|- style="background:#bfb"
| 102 || July 27 || @ Marlins || 3–1 || Bobby Muñoz (7–3) || Pat Rapp (6–6) || None || 40,017 || 50–52
|- style="background:#fbb"
| 103 || July 29 || @ Braves || 2–5 || Steve Avery (7–3) || Danny Jackson (13–5) || None || 48,921 || 50–53
|- style="background:#bfb"
| 104 || July 30 || @ Braves || 5–2 || Heathcliff Slocumb (5–1) || Greg McMichael (3–5) || Doug Jones (27) || 49,101 || 51–53
|- style="background:#fbb"
| 105 || July 31 || @ Braves || 5–9 || Mike Bielecki (2–0) || Ben Rivera (3–4) || None || 48,992 || 51–54
|-

|- style="background:#fbb"
| 106 || August 2 || Pirates || 2–3 || Rick White (4–5) || Bobby Muñoz (7–4) || Dan Miceli (2) || 40,164 || 51–55
|- style="background:#bfb"
| 107 || August 3 || Pirates || 7–0 || Danny Jackson (14–5) || Steve Cooke (4–10) || None || 36,542 || 52–55
|- style="background:#fbb"
| 108 || August 4 || Pirates || 1–5 || Jon Lieber (6–6) || Curt Schilling (1–8) || None || 37,481 || 52–56
|- style="background:#fbb"
| 109 || August 5 || Expos || 0–5 || Pedro Martínez (10–5) || David West (4–9) || None || 33,642 || 52–57
|- style="background:#fbb"
| 110 || August 6 || Expos || 3–4 (11) || John Wetteland (4–6) || Doug Jones (2–4) || Jeff Shaw (1) || 41,699 || 52–58
|- style="background:#fbb"
| 111 || August 7 || Expos || 4–6 || Ken Hill (16–5) || Bobby Muñoz (7–5) || Mel Rojas (16) || 45,346 || 52–59
|- style="background:#fbb"
| 112 || August 8 || Mets || 2–3 || Bobby J. Jones (12–7) || Danny Jackson (14–6) || John Franco (29) || 35,977 || 52–60
|- style="background:#bfb"
| 113 || August 9 || Mets || 5–1 || Curt Schilling (2–8) || Mike Remlinger (1–5) || None || 31,740 || 53–60
|- style="background:#fbb"
| 114 || August 10 || Mets || 2–6 || Bret Saberhagen (14–4) || David West (4–10) || John Franco (30) || 36,716 || 53–61
|- style="background:#bfb"
| 115 || August 11 || Mets || 2–1 (15) || Tom Edens' (5–1) || Mauro Gozzo (3–5) || None || 37,605 || 54–61
|-

Roster

Player statistics

Batting

Starters by positionNote: Pos = Position; G = Games played; AB = At bats; H = Hits; Avg. = Batting average; HR = Home runs; RBI = Runs batted inOther battersNote: G = Games played; AB = At bats; H = Hits; Avg. = Batting average; HR = Home runs; RBI = Runs batted inPitching

 Starting pitchers Note: G = Games pitched; ; IP = Innings pitched; W = Wins; L = Losses; ERA = Earned run average; SO = StrikeoutsOther pitchersNote: G = Games pitched; IP = Innings pitched; W = Wins; L = Losses; ERA = Earned run average; SO = Strikeouts Relief pitchers Note: G = Games pitched; W = Wins; L = Losses; SV = Saves; ERA = Earned run average; SO = Strikeouts''

Farm system

References

External links
1994 Philadelphia Phillies season at Baseball Reference

Philadelphia Phillies seasons
Philadelphia Phillies Season, 1994
Philadelphia Phillies